Óscar López Martínez (born 5 February 1984) is a Spanish footballer who plays as a central defender.

Football career
Born in Valencia, López made his debut as a senior with amateurs CFA Barrio de la Luz. He first appeared in Segunda División B in the 2004–05 season, featuring in less than one third of the matches for Benidorm CF.

In the summer of 2005, López joined Villarreal CF, initially being assigned to the reserves in Tercera División. He made his first and only La Liga appearance with the former on 22 April 2006, starting in a 0–2 home defeat against Real Sociedad; additionally, he helped the B's promote to the third level in 2007.

In the following six years, López competed in division three, representing Benidorm, CD Dénia, Ontinyent CF and CD Alcoyano.

References

External links
 
 
 
 
 
  

1984 births
Living people
Footballers from Valencia (city)
Spanish footballers
Association football defenders
La Liga players
Segunda División B players
Tercera División players
Benidorm CF footballers
Villarreal CF B players
Villarreal CF players
Ontinyent CF players
CD Alcoyano footballers
Atlético Saguntino players